Frank Whittington Creighton (December 3, 1879 – December 23, 1948) was an American Episcopal bishop.

He was the second missionary bishop of the Diocese of Mexico, sixth bishop of the Diocese of Michigan, and a suffragan bishop of the Diocese of Long Island in the Episcopal Church in the United States of America.

Early life and education
Creighton was born on December 3, 1879, in Philadelphia, the son of Thomas Creighton and Elizabeth Whittington. He was educated at the Northeast Manual Training School and Brown's College Preparatory School in Philadelphia. Between 1898 and 1912, he was engaged in business. He graduated with a Bachelor of Sacred Theology in 1915, after studying at the Philadelphia Divinity School. The same institution awarded him a Doctor of Sacred Theology in 1926, while Kenyon College awarded him a Doctor of Divinity in 1940.

Ordained Ministry
Creighton was ordained deacon in 1914 and priest on June 24, 1915, by Bishop Philip M. Rhinelander of Pennsylvania. He then served as vicar of the Church of the Redeemer in Andalusia, Pennsylvania. In 1916, he became rector of St. Andrew's Church in Albany, New York. He also served as rector of St Ann's Church in Brooklyn, New York City between 1923 and 1926.

Bishop
Creighton served in a number of episcopal positions. He raised to the episcopate when he was elected Missionary Bishop of Mexico in 1925. He was consecrated bishop on January 12, 1926, at 10:30 A.M. Place,in St Ann's Church, Brooklyn, by Presiding Bishop John Gardner Murray. He served as executive secretary of the Department of Domestic Missions of the Episcopal Church between 1930 and 1933. He remained in Mexico until his election as Suffragan Bishop of Long Island and Archdeacon of Queens and Nassau on February 14, 1933. On January 27, 1937, Creighton was elected Coadjutor Bishop of Michigan, and was installed as coadjutor on May 2, 1937. He succeeded as diocesan bishop in 1940. He died in office on December 23, 1948.

Family
His son, William Forman Creighton, was the fifth Bishop of the Episcopal Diocese of Washington, and grandson, Michael W. Creighton, was the ninth bishop of Episcopal Diocese of Central Pennsylvania.

References 

1879 births
1948 deaths
Clergy from Philadelphia
Episcopal Divinity School alumni
Kenyon College alumni
Episcopal bishops of Michigan
20th-century Anglican bishops in Mexico
20th-century Anglican bishops in the United States
Anglican bishops of Mexico